Ministry of the State of Denmark (The Prime Minister's Office) is a Kingdom government ministry. Atypical of a Danish ministry it does not have any councils, boards or committees associated with it and its near sole responsibility is to act as the secretariat of the Prime Minister of Denmark. There is a small department under the ministry that takes care of special legal issues not covered under other ministries, among others Greenland's and Faroe Islands relation to the Danish monarchy, the mass media's contact to the State, number of ministers in the government, or Queen Margrethe II legal status as a civilian.

The Ministry of the State of Denmark was founded January 1, 1914, though its origin can be found in a small secretariat created in 1848, the Council of State ("Statsrådet") to assist the new Council President ("konseilspræsident"), the name used for the Prime Minister of Denmark from 1855 to 1918.

Government ministries of Denmark
Government ministerial offices of Denmark
Ministries established in 1914